The Cobra is a family of armored vehicles produced by Otokar of Turkey. It is produced in two generations.

The Cobra is an armoured tactical vehicle developed by Turkish firm Otokar.

Durability
The monocoque steel v-hull provides protection against small arms fire, artillery shell shrapnel, and to a certain degree against anti-personnel and tank mines, and IEDs. Front wheel arches are designed to be blown away to free blast pockets.

In December 2016, footage of an ISIL attack against Turkish M-60 Sabra tanks circulating the Internet, showed the crew of a Cobra APC surviving a direct hit from an ISIL RPG.

The Cobra vehicle forms a common platform which can be adapted for various roles and mission requirements including: armoured personnel carrier, anti-tank vehicle, reconnaissance vehicle, ground surveillance radar vehicle, forward observation vehicle, armoured ambulance, armoured command post, turreted vehicle for 12.7mm machine gun (turret produced by the Israeli firm Rafael), 20mm cannon, anti-tank missiles such as the TOW missile and Spike missiles or surface-to-air missiles.

Cobras can be used as amphibious combat vehicles. Turkish naval forces are currently looking for a new amphibious vehicle and the Cobra is listed among the candidates for acquisition.

Cobra II

The Cobra II, a further development of the existing Cobra,  is an amoured tactical vehicle designed and produced by Turkish company Otokar. Cobra II is a 4x4 wheeled armoured vehicle and has a capacity for nine personnel including the driver and the commander. It features high level of protection against threats from improvised explosive devices, land mines. Among its various functions are security and peacekeeping operations and border protection. The personnel carrier can be produced in different versions, according to different security requirements of the user thanks to its modular design.

Run flat, CTIS, air conditioning system, blackout lighting system and towing eye are among the standard equipment of the vehicle. It can be additionally fitted with a self-recovery winch, a CBRN filtration kit, automatic fire extinguishing system, navigation system, intercom system and an auxiliary power unit. It can be optionally equipped with a remote controlled weapon system (RCWS) of up to 30 mm machine gun or grenade launcher.

It serves in the Turkish Armed Forces and security forces. It is also used by several other countries as well as by the United Nations in peacekeeping missions. The development of the armoured vehicle, which is used for patrolling at the Syria–Turkey barrier, was funded by the European Union. It was presented for the first time in May 2013.

First unveiled at IDEF 2013, the Cobra II is a more heavily armoured successor to the Cobra. The Cobra II has a combat weight that is roughly double that of its predecessor and is slightly wider, longer and taller.

Standard equipment includes rear view camera, thermal front camera, air conditioning system, blackout lighting system, multi-point seat belts, radio provisions, and a towing eye. It can be optionally equipped with a self-recovery winch, nuclear, biological and chemical filtration kit, automation fire extinguishing system, intercom system, navigation system and an auxiliary power unit. In an APC configuration, the vehicle can carry nine personnel and can be armed with a number of different weapons, including crew-operated machine guns and remote weapon stations armed with short-range surface-to-air missiles and grenade launchers.

Cobra II is powered by a 6.7L, six-cylinder, water cooled, turbo charged, common rail, diesel engine mated to an automatic gearbox (six forward and one reverse). It produces a power of 360 hp (269 kW) at 2,650rpm, and torque of 1100Nm at 1,400rpm. The engine is also compatible with F-34 and F-54 fuel. It has a maximum speed of 110 km/h (68 mph) and can operate in range of 700 km (430 mi).

Otokar has received orders for the Cobra II both from an undisclosed customer and from the Turkish Armed Forces.

In late 2015, the Turkish Armed Forces ordered 82 Cobra II vehicles plus related systems, maintenance and support worth $52 million. In June 2016, the Turkish Armed Forces ordered an undisclosed number of Cobra II vehicles plus related systems, maintenance and support worth $120.8 million. Assuming the same value to vehicle ratio as the 2015 order, this would imply an order of about 180 vehicles.

Export

Bangladesh
Received 22 Cobra IMV in 2007–2008, 22 in 2013, and 67 Cobra II MRAP in 2017–2018.

Pakistan 
According to sources, Pakistan purchased over 200 of these vehicles and plan to have about 500 in their inventory. A deal was concluded with TOT and the remaining vehicles are to be produced at Heavy Industries Taxila with additional orders for Otokar Akrep.

Operational history

Georgia 
In the 2008 South Ossetia war, Cobra vehicles equipped with 12.7 mm NSV machine guns and 40 mm automatic grenade launchers were used by the special forces of the Georgian Ministry of Internal Affairs during their assault on the city in the Battle of Tskhinvali. One of the Cobras were destroyed and captured by the Russian army. Cobras are also being used by Georgian UN forces in the Central African Republic.

Nigeria 
The Nigerian military has deployed Cobras during operations against the Boko Haram insurgency in the north-east of the country since 2013.

Turkey 
Cobras are actively being used by the Turkish Armed Forces within the country for anti-terrorism operations.

Cobras have shown to be highly resistant against most mine and IED attacks, with the crew surviving most incidents without any injuries. The increasing sophistication of IED use by the PKK and the loss of eight soldiers inside one on August 19, 2015, has prompted the Turkish Armed Forces to upgrade its fleet of armoured vehicles. This has, in part, led to additional orders for the improved Cobra II.

Cobras have also been used effectively by Turkish backed militias against ISIS and YPG during Operation Euphrates Shield.

Cobras were used by the Turkish Armed Forces as part of NATO's International Security Assistance Force and Resolute Support Mission in Afghanistan.

Burkina Faso 
A Burkinabe army vehicle was struck by an IED in the area of Kompienbiga, after hitting an IED laid by insurgents. The explosion overturned the vehicle, after which it caught fire; there were three killed and four wounded in the attack.

Operators

Cobra
 
 
 
 
 
 
 
 
 
 
 
 
 
 
 : 194 Cobras.
 
 : 30 Cobras. Used in UN peacekeeping ops in the Central African Republic.
 
  — Small number captured from ISIL, which in turn captured them from Turkish-backed rebel forces
  Syrian National Army
 
  — 100+ bought in the mid-2010s. Used by the State Border Service.

Cobra II

Gallery

See also
Interceptor ASV of Pakistan 
 Komatsu LAV of Japan
 Véhicule Blindé Léger of France
 Dozor-B of Ukraine
 VN-4 of China
P2 (armoured vehicle) of Indonesia
 MOWAG Eagle

Sources

External links

 Explosives and Small Arms Test carried out in 1997.
 Otokar of Turkey

Wheeled amphibious armoured fighting vehicles
Armoured cars
Wheeled armoured fighting vehicles
Internal security vehicles
Armoured fighting vehicles of Turkey
Cobra
Reconnaissance vehicles
Military vehicles introduced in the 1990s
Armoured fighting vehicles of the post–Cold War period